A motion compensator is a device that decreases the undesirable effects of the relative motion between two connected objects.  Motion compensators are usually placed between a floating object and a more stationary object, such as a vessel or a structure fixed to the seabed. The motion compensator does not prevent the motion, but tries to eliminate the negative effects of the movement. These negative effects include (1) the changes in force and stresses, and (2) the hysteresis, i.e., the rapid start-and-stop "jerking" of the objects. 

A heave compensator is a kind of motion compensator. Whereas most motion compensators will compensate for movement in all directions, the heave compensator will compensate for movement in only one direction, for instance, for vertical movement. In practice, the words motion compensator and heave compensator are used interchangeably. Sensor technologies being used are inertial sensors and GNSS (example: iMAR Navigation) or image processing.

The simplest motion compensator is the anchor chain of a ship. Not only does the anchor prevent the ship from drifting, but the chain itself dampens the movement of the ship due to undulating motion of the waves.  Generally, motion compensators are implemented as springs. For very large forces (dozens to hundreds of tonnes), the springs are implemented as gas springs: hydropneumatic devices — a plunger cylinder buffered by a volume of gas.

Examples of heave compensators include:
Drill string compensators
Riser tensioners
Conductor tensioners
Guideline tensioners

More advanced heave compensated systems are often specified as systems with Passive Heave Compensation or Active Heave Compensation or combinations of these. A new approach to advanced heave compensation systems is offered by Balanced Heave Compensation, increasing safety while lowering energy consumption and spring adjustment times.

Mechanisms (engineering)